The Letterman Army Hospital, established around 1898 and redesignated as the Letterman Army Medical Center (LAMC) in 1969, was a US Army facility at the Presidio of San Francisco in San Francisco, California, US. It was decommissioned in 1994. Some of the original 1898 buildings still exist and now house the Thoreau Center for Sustainability. The Letterman Army Medical Center built in the 1960s era was demolished to make way for Letterman Digital Arts Center.

History 

The hospital, built in 1898 and named in 1911 for Major Jonathan Letterman, MD (1824–1872) –  known as the "Father of Battlefield Medicine" – was utilized in every US foreign conflict in the 20th century, and remained in service until the army base was decommissioned in 1995. Due to its location on the West Coast, the hospital often served as a key stateside point in support of American wars in the Pacific. In 1945, the hospital received more than 73,000 patients from the Pacific Theater of World War II. The hospital had an Italian Service Unit of 40 men to help at the hospital during the war. During the Vietnam War, the hospital received wounded American soldiers returning to the mainland.

The building was decommissioned in 1994 when the base was transferred to the National Park Service and was demolished in 2002. In 2005, Lucasfilm opened the Letterman Digital Arts Center on the site of the old hospital.

See also 
Public Health Service Hospital (San Francisco)
List of former United States Army medical units

References

External links
Letterman Army Medical Center on Militarymuseum.org
Farewell Favorites: Letterman Hospital
Letterman Complex Final Planning and Design Guidelines

Hospital buildings completed in 1898
1994 disestablishments in California
Closed installations of the United States Army
Closed medical facilities of the United States Army
History of San Francisco
Hospitals established in 1898
Hospitals in San Francisco
Defunct hospitals in California
Presidio of San Francisco